Salamat Ali Khan (12 December 1934  11 July 2001) was a Pakistani vocalist and touring artist known for his contribution to the Hindustani classical music. 

Widely regarded as one of the greatest classical singers of the Indian subcontinent, he was active in music industry, particularly in classical music after the partition of the Indian subcontinent, however he earned his recognition before he migrated to Pakistan. In 1969, he appeared in Edinburgh Festival, leading him to earn international recognition. He visited several countries, including India after partition where he participated in music concert, All India Music Conference in Calcutta. During unstable India–Pakistan relations, he visited India along with his brother Nazakat Ali Khan around 1953 where his music concert was also attended by Jawaharlal Nehru, the first prime minister of India.

Biography
Born in Hoshiarpur, British India in Sham Chaurasia gharana, he belonged to a family of musicians and was influenced by khyal, a style of Hindustani classical music. After he appeared in music concerts, Sham Chaurasia gharana earned recognition in the Indian subcontinent.

He married Razia Begum, with whom he had eight children, including four daughters and four sons. He trained two of his two sons Sharafat Ali Khan and Shafqat Ali Khan with classical music, leading the Sham Chaurasia gharana to retain its position in traditional music.

He, along with his brother (collectively known as Ali brothers) was introduced to singing at the age of twelve by his father, Ustad Vilayat Ali Khan who taught him singing later he learned from Ustad Bade Ghulam Ali Khan. After learning music, he went to Calcutta (in modern-day Kolkata) where he appeared in a music conference. His family later migrated to Lahore in 1947 following the partition of India.

Prior to migrating to Multan, he appeared in Harballabh Sangeet Sammelan in 1941. In 1955, he returned from Multan and went to his then hometown, Lahore. He was assigned music conferences by the All India Radio and worked for the station for over ten years. He later quit the job following the Indo-Pakistani War of 1965 and subsequently went to Pakistan. As a solo singer, he participated in several music concerts in England, America, Holland, Scotland, Germany, Italy, Switzerland, Afghanistan, Nepal and Singapore, as well as Pakistan. In 1973, he and his brother, Nazakat parted their duo over uncertain personal issues, however Salamat later continued playing his role as a solo singer.

Awards

Death 
He died from kidney failure in Lahore on 11 July 2001 and is buried in Charagh Shah Wali shrine where his brothers, spouse and his eldest son, Sharafat Ali Khan are also buried.

References

External links 
Ustad Salamat Ali Khan at the Library of Congress

1934 births
2001 deaths
Hindustani singers
Pakistani classical singers
Pakistani male singers
Singers from Lahore
Punjabi people
Recipients of the Pride of Performance
Recipients of Sitara-i-Imtiaz
20th-century Indian male singers
20th-century Indian singers
Indian emigrants to Pakistan